Pârâul Alb may refer to the following rivers in Romania:

 Pârâul Alb (Timiș), a tributary of the Feneș in Caraș-Severin County
 Pârâul Alb, a tributary of the Jiu in Gorj County
 Pârâul Alb, a tributary of the Orăștie in Hunedoara County
 Pârâul Alb, a tributary of the Secu in Neamț County
 Pârâul Alb, a tributary of the Telejenel in Prahova County